Pucajasa (possibly from Quechua puka red, q'asa mountain pass, "red mountain pass") is a mountain in the Urubamba mountain range in the Andes of Peru, about  high. It is located in the Cusco Region, Urubamba Province, Urubamba District. It lies at the pass named Pumahuancajasa (possibly from Quechua for "Pumahuanca pass").

References

Mountains of Peru
Mountains of Cusco Region